Joseph "Ziggy" Modeliste (born December 28, 1948), also known as Zigaboo, is an American drummer best known as a founding member of the funk band the Meters. He is widely considered an innovator in the funk genre and New Orleans style drumming. The Meters' music had a defining role and set the stylistic tone of New Orleans funk. Due to his work with the band, Modeliste is credited as an integral part of bringing New Orleans second-line grooves into popular music.

As a songwriter and session musician Modeliste's work is featured in numerous albums by various artists. His drum grooves appear in hundreds of hip hop samples, television and film. He has released four solo albums. He resides in the San Francisco Bay Area and continues to perform and tour.

Early life 
Modeliste grew up in the 13th Ward of New Orleans. The eldest of six siblings, he was raised in part by his grandmother, Lula Blouin. His first drum set was a three-piece paid for by Blouin. He was nicknamed Zigaboo at age ten by a neighborhood kid, and by junior high school the name had stuck. His drumming style was influenced by Smokey Johnson, Bob French and other New Orleans drum greats as he learned by watching them perform at gigs. He said listening to other musicians was the most important part of his learning process. He particularly tried to emulate Smokey Johnson's style. He started playing gigs at an early age including a stint with the Hawketts, a band led by Art Neville at the time. Over time the band evolved into the Neville Sounds and by late 1960s into the Meters. In a 2013 interview with Modern Drummer, Modeliste said: "Your biggest teachers were those two things you got on the side of your head. (...) It's got nothing to do with rudiments, nothing to do with time signatures, but it's got a lot to do with what you hear."

Early career 
Modeliste was a founding member and drummer of the funk group the Meters. The Meters were formed in 1965 and became well known in the vibrant New Orleans music scene. The band was eventually signed to Allen Toussaint's record label Sansu Enterprises and served as the label's studio band. Over the years the Meters became staple artists and the purveyors of the traditional New Orleans funk sound.

Modeliste's work with The Meters solidified his status as an innovative and skilled drummer. This was further displayed when Modeliste, along with the Meters, were invited to tour with the Rolling Stones in 1975 and 1976 serving as their opening act. The Meters also served as the backing band for acts such as Dr. John, Robert Palmer, Lee Dorsey, Paul McCartney, Betty Harris and others – all with Modeliste on drums. When The Meters disbanded in late 1970s, Modeliste continued to tour and serve as the drummer for various musicians – touring with Keith Richards and Ron Wood in the New Barbarians shortly after the split.

Legacy and influence
Since the late 1970s, Modeliste has partnered with numerous artists in both a touring and recording capacity. Some of these artists include:

 Dr. John
 The Wild Tchoupitoulas
 Allen Toussaint
 Lee Dorsey
 Robert Palmer
 Keith Richards
 Bill Laswell
 Aaron Neville
 Professor Longhair
 John Fogerty
 Harry Connick Jr.
 Mark Ronson
 Yael Naim
 Kids on Bridges
 Robert Stewart

The respect of industry peers remains strong in 2018, as the Recording Academy has honored Modeliste and the Meters with a Lifetime Achievement Grammy Award. 
Modeliste's work has been influential. His signature drumming style has amassed a large following in the drumming community, in which Modeliste occasionally gives master classes. Some of his best known grooves include "Cissy Strut" and "Look-Ka Py-Py". In reviewing a compilation album of the Meters' early works, music critic Robert Christgau called Modeliste's drumming "the secret" adding "it's almost as if he's the lead". In 2016 he was listed as the 18th best drummer of all time by Rolling Stone magazine. In describing his drumming style, in 2008 Modeliste said, "It's just a collage of all the drummers that I heard play in my lifetime from [New Orleans]."

Modeliste's work is credited on hundreds of recordings by a variety of artists. His drum patterns have been sampled extensively by hip hop artists such as Run DMC, Public Enemy, Beastie Boys, Ice Cube, LL Cool J, Queen Latifah and Salt-N-Pepa. His performances have been featured in film, television and game soundtracks, including Red, Jackie Brown, Drumline and 8 Mile. Modeliste is a Vic Firth, DW, and Sabian signature artist.

Current work and projects
Modeliste has released three studio albums and a live album as a leader. His first album titled Zigaboo.com was released in 2000. His second album I'm on the Right Track was released in 2004 and features contributors Dr. John and Bernie Worrell. In 2007 he contributed to a tribute album honoring Fats Domino with the song "I'm Gonna Be a Wheel Someday" with collaborators Herbie Hancock and Renard Poche. His live album titled Funk Me Hard Live was released in 2009. The drum heavy performance was recorded in 1980 with Modeliste performing with his first post-Meters band, the Gaboon's Gang, at the Saenger Theatre. His third studio album New Life was released in 2011. The album features works by several artists including Wardell Quezergue and George Porter.

In 2005 he recorded with Young Gunz on the BMI award-winning song "Can't Stop Won't Stop", and his drum patterns were sampled on the percussion heavy Grammy nominated song "1 Thing". In 2011 producer-musician Mark Ronson collaborated with Modeliste, Erykah Badu, Mos Def and Trombone Shorty for the song "A La Modeliste", which was named for Modeliste's influence on funk drumming and the New Orleans sound. He was the featured artist in the August 2013 issue of Modern Drummer magazine.

In the 1980s Modeliste moved to Los Angeles and later to the San Francisco Bay Area, settling in Oakland, California. Having been involved in disputes over publishing rights of the Meters recordings, he got involved in the business side of the music industry. He started a record label, JZM Records, and a music publishing company, Jomod Music. He performs regularly in the San Francisco Bay Area, Los Angeles, and New Orleans.

Solo discography
 Zigaboo.com (JZM, 2000)
 I'm On the Right Track (JZM, 2004)
 Funk Me Hard Live (JZM, 2009)
 New Life (JZM, 2011)

Instructional videos
 Zigaboo Modeliste: The Originator of New Orleans Funky Drumming (2012) DVD

Discography with The Meters
The Meters (Josie, 1969) 
Look-Ka Py Py (Josie, 1970)
Struttin' (Josie, 1970)
Cabbage Alley (Reprise, 1972)
Rejuvenation (Reprise, 1974)
Cissy Strut (Island, 1974)
Fire on the Bayou (Reprise, 1975)
The Best of The Meters (Mardi Gras, Virgo, 1975) 
Trick Bag (Reprise, 1976)
New Directions (Warner Bros., 1977)
 Good Old Funky Music (Rounder, 1990)
Funky Miracle (Charly, 1991) Uptown Rulers: The Meters live on the Queen Mary (Rhino, 1992)Live at the Moonwalker (Lakeside, 1993)Fundamentally Funky (Charly, 1994)Funkify Your Life: The Meters Anthology (Rhino, 1995)

As sideman
Credits partly adapted from AllMusic.Troublemaker (Mercury, 1979) with Ian McLaganKristen Vigard (Private Music, 1988) with Kristen VigardStoryville (Geffen, 1991) with Robbie RobertsonShe (Sony music entertainment, 1994) with Harry Connick Jr.Ekstasis (Axiom, 1993) with Nicky Skopelitis and Bill LaswellSouth Delta Space Age (Antilles, 1995) with Third Rail (James Blood Ulmer and Bill Laswell)(It Must've Been Ol') Santa Claus'' (Columbia, 1993) with Harry Connick, Jr.

References

External links

Zigaboo Modeliste in the Spotlight – video at Drum Channel

American funk drummers
American session musicians
American soul musicians
African-American drummers
Rhythm and blues musicians from New Orleans
Musicians from Oakland, California
1948 births
Living people
The Meters members
20th-century American drummers
American male drummers
20th-century American male musicians
20th-century African-American musicians
21st-century African-American people